James Copley (born October 18, 1951) is an American bobsledder. He competed in the four man event at the 1972 Winter Olympics.

References

1951 births
Living people
American male bobsledders
Olympic bobsledders of the United States
Bobsledders at the 1972 Winter Olympics
Place of birth missing (living people)